Gao Mingjie (born November 23, 1980, in Shangri-La City) is a Paralympian athlete from China competing mainly in category F42-44 javelin throw events.

Gao competed in the 2004 Summer Paralympics in Athens, Greece and won a silver medal in the men's F44-46 javelin throw event. At the 2008 Summer Paralympics in Beijing, China he won a gold medal in the men's F42-44 javelin throw event. Four years later he won a second gold, in the javelin throw (T44) at the 2012 Summer Paralympics in London.

References

1980 births
Living people
Athletes from Yunnan
Chinese male javelin throwers
Athletes (track and field) at the 2004 Summer Paralympics
Athletes (track and field) at the 2008 Summer Paralympics
Athletes (track and field) at the 2012 Summer Paralympics
Medalists at the 2004 Summer Paralympics
Paralympic athletes of China
Paralympic gold medalists for China
Medalists at the 2008 Summer Paralympics
Medalists at the 2012 Summer Paralympics
Paralympic medalists in athletics (track and field)
21st-century Chinese people
Medalists at the 2010 Asian Para Games
World Para Athletics Championships winners
Paralympic javelin throwers